= Arkady Dokhoyan =

Armenian football player

Personal information
- Date of birth: 12 August 1977 (age 49)
- Position: Defender

International career
Years	Team	Apps	(Gls)
2001	Armenia	5	(0)

Arkady Dokhoyan (born 12 August 1977) is an Armenian football player. He has played for Armenia national team.

== National team statistics ==
Armenia national team
Year	Apps	Goals
2001	5	0
Total	5	0
